Raipur–Bilaspur Expressway is an 4/6 lane tolled expressway linking Bilaspur and Raipur, two key cities in Chhattisgarh State. The National Highway 130 and the National Highway 30 connect these cities. The highway stretches from Raipur to Bilaspur and is the busiest highway in the state.

The project was first conceived in 2012 but due to delays in land acquisition and the bankruptcy of the awarded contractor delayed the project for many years, In 2016 NHAI re-started the project and hired three contractors to complete the 127 km highway project. The highway was completed at the cost of 15.50 billion INR in May 2019. Raipur and Bilaspur are two significant Urban agglomeration and industrial cities. The road had been a most awaited project for the state government and its public for longtime since Chhattisgarh became a state in 2000.

Salient Features & Gallery
Some data about the Raipur - Bilaspur Expressway:

 Length - 
 Right of Way - 
 Number of Lanes - 4 lanes 
 Type of Pavement - Rigid (Concrete)
 Maximum Axle Load (Design) -  
 Bypasses - 7
 Interchange - 2
 Main Toll Plaza - 3
 Underpass - 35
 Railway Over Bridge - 1
 Major Bridge - 4
 Minor Bridge - 19
 Culverts - 172
 Vehicular Underpasses - 22
 Bus bays - 15
 Truck lay by bay - 2
 Flyover - 3

The Expressway has SOS booths along the route besides a toll-free helpline. CCTV cameras are installed every 5 km (3.1 mi) along the expressway for safety and accident assistance. 

Whole 127 KM stretch which starts from Tatibandh chowk in Raipur and ends in Darrighat in Bilaspur. Its construction package was divided into three patches: 

 Bilaspur- Sargaon (36 km) (4- lane) 
 Sargaon - Simga  (43 km)  (4-lane) 
 Simga - Raipur  (48 km)   (4-6 lane) 

This highway is said to be one of backbone infrastructures in state which connects entire northern part of the state to its capital city, Raipur.

References

External links
 हाईकोर्ट ने कहा- 15 जुलाई तक पूरा करें बिलासपुर और रायपुर फोरलेन का काम
 Raipur Bilaspur Road Work Expedited After Instructions Issued By Hc
 Rs 8,191.48 cr road projects in Chhattisgarh delayed

Expressways in Chhattisgarh
Transport in Chhattisgarh
Transport in Bilaspur, Chhattisgarh
Transport in Raipur, Chhattisgarh